This is a list of the candidates who ran for the Libertarian Party of Canada in the 42nd Canadian federal election.

British Columbia

Alberta

Saskatchewan

Manitoba

Ontario

Quebec

Nova Scotia

Candidates in the 2015 Canadian federal election
2015